Blue Lake Township is the name of some places in the U.S. state of Michigan:

 Blue Lake Township, Kalkaska County, Michigan
 Blue Lake Township, Muskegon County, Michigan

Michigan township disambiguation pages